Jean-Bernard Sindeu is a Cameroonian politician who served in the government of Cameroon as Minister of Energy and Water Resources from 2006 to 2009. Considered a technocrat, he was appointed to that position on 22 September 2006. He was previously the First Assistant Mayor of Bana, which is located in West Province; he remains in that position as of 2007.

Sindeu was dismissed from the government on 30 June 2009.

References

Year of birth missing (living people)
Living people
Energy in Cameroon
Government ministers of Cameroon